Grenfell may refer to:

Buildings
 Grenfell Campus, Memorial University of Newfoundland, Canada
 Grenfell Centre, Adelaide, Australia, an office block
 Grenfell railway station, New South Wales, Australia
 Grenfell Tower, a building in London, UK

People
 Alice Grenfell (1842–1917), British suffragist and Egyptologist
 Bernard Pyne Grenfell (1869–1926), English Egyptologist
 Bryan Grenfell (b. 1954), British biologist
 Cecil Grenfell (1864–1924), soldier and British Liberal politician
 Charles Grenfell (1790–1867), British businessman and politician
 Charles Grenfell (1823–1861), British politician
 Clarine Coffin Grenfell (1910–2004), American poet
 David Grenfell (1881–1968), Welsh politician
 Diana Grenfell, (1935 - 2021), British plantswoman
 Edward Grenfell, 1st Baron St Just (1870–1941), British politician and banker
 Ettie Grenfell, Baroness Desborough (1967–1952), British society hostess
 Eustace Grenfell (1890–1964), British pilot
 Frances Grenfell, later Campbell-Preston (1918–2022), British author and courtier
 Francis Grenfell, 1st Baron Grenfell (1841–1925), British soldier
 Francis Octavius Grenfell (1880–1915), English soldier and Victoria Cross winner
 George Grenfell (1849–1906), Cornish missionary and explorer
 George St. Leger Grenfell (1808–1868), British soldier of fortune
 Helen Loring Grenfell (1863–1935), American suffragist and state superintendent of schools
 Henry Grenfell (1824–1902), British banker and politician
 Hubert Grenfell (1845–1906), British naval officer
 Joanne Grenfell (b. 1972), British bishop
 John Pascoe Grenfell (1800–1869), British admiral in the Brazilian Navy
 Joyce Grenfell (1910–1979), English actress, comedian and singer–songwriter
 Julian Grenfell (1888–1915), British poet and son of Lord Desborough
 Julian Grenfell, 3rd Baron Grenfell (b. 1935), British politician
 Maria Grenfell (b. 1969), Australian musician and composer
 Pascoe Grenfell (1761–1838), British businessman and politician
 Pascoe Grenfell, 2nd Baron Grenfell (1905–1976), British politician
 Pascoe St Leger Grenfell (1798–1879), British businessman
 Peter Grenfell, 2nd Baron St Just (1922–1984), British politician
 Stephen Grenfell (d. 1989), British broadcaster
 Stephen Grenfell (b. 1966), English footballer
 Wilfred Grenfell (1865–1940), British medical missionary
 William Grenfell, 1st Baron Desborough (1855–1945), British athlete, sportsman and public servant

Given name
 Grenfell Jones (1934–2007), Welsh cartoonist
 Grenfell Price (1892–1977), Australian geographer
 Arthur Grenfell Wauchope (1874–1947), British army officer and colonial administrator

Places
 Grenfell, New South Wales, Australia, a town
 Grenfell, Saskatchewan, Canada, a town 
 Grenfell Street, Adelaide, Australia

Other uses
 Grenfell Cloth, a cotton twill fabric
 Grenfell Tower fire, a fatal fire at a tower block in London in June 2017